Amata endocrocis is a moth of the family Erebidae. It was described by George Hampson in 1903. It is found in the Democratic Republic of the Congo, South Africa and Zimbabwe.

References

 

Endocro
Moths of Africa
Moths described in 1903